Bombus turneri is a species of cuckoo bumblebee.

Bumblebees
Insects described in 1929